Aksentyev (masculine) or Aksentyeva (feminine) is a Russian last name, a variant of Aksyonov.

People with the last name
M. S. Aksentyeva, editorial manager of Physics-Uspekhi, a Russian journal of physics
Zinaida Aksentyeva, Russian astronomer after whom Aksentyeva, a crater on Venus, is named

Toponyms
Aksentyeva, alternative name of Aksentyevo, a village in Borisovskoye Rural Settlement of Mozhaysky District in Moscow Oblast;

See also
Eftim Aksentiev (b. 1985), Macedonian association football player
Aksentyevo, several rural localities in Russia

References

Notes

Sources
И. М. Ганжина (I. M. Ganzhina). "Словарь современных русских фамилий" (Dictionary of Modern Russian Last Names). Москва, 2001. 



Russian-language surnames